Nā mele paleoleo (sometimes "mele paleoleo") is a form of contemporary Hawaiian music that blends hip hop with native Hawaiian rapping. Known as a form of Hawaiian performance poetry, spoken-word performers of nā mele paleoleo are gaining popularity due to rap and hip hop influences. The genre was influenced by emcees including Native Hawaiian activist and rapper, Charlotte "MC Frumpy" Kaluna, along with Joseph "DJ ELITE" Netherland in the late '80s. Sudden Rush were the first group to record nā mele paleoleo in 1993 and became the most notable performers in the genre. Nā mele paleoleo means "songs that speak loudly and angrily" and was approved as an official Hawaiian term because of the advocacy of Don Ke'ala, a member of Sudden Rush. The lyrics are often overtly political, endorsing Native Hawaiian sovereignty.

References

Hawaiian music
American hip hop genres